Paul Nicholas Denny (born 5 September 1957) is an English retired footballer who played in the Football League for Southend United and Wimbledon as a midfielder.

References

1957 births
Living people
Footballers from Croydon
English footballers
Association football midfielders
Southend United F.C. players
Wimbledon F.C. players